Paludomus ajanensis is a species of tropical freshwater snail with an operculum, aquatic gastropod mollusk in the family Thiaridae. The natural habitat of this species is rivers. It is threatened by habitat loss.

This species lives in the Seychelles.

References

Paludomidae
Gastropods described in 1860
Taxonomy articles created by Polbot